Ifans is a Welsh surname. Notable people with the surname include:

Dafydd Ifans (born 1949), Welsh novelist and translator
Llŷr Ifans (born 1968), Welsh actor
Rhiannon Ifans (born 1954), Welsh academic and writer
Rhys Ifans (born 1967), Welsh actor, producer, and musician

Welsh-language surnames